Frederic Serrano Keating (March 27, 1901 – June 29, 1961), best known as  Fred Keating, was an American magician, stage and film actor.

Biography

Keating was born in New York City, the son of Frederick Keating (Senior), a lawyer, and Camille Serrano, a  singer. He was of Irish-Spanish heritage. His parents divorced when he was young. He became interested in magic from an early age. He became well known for performing a disappearing canary cage trick. Keating also performed a trick where he swallowed needles and pulled them threaded, out of his mouth.

Selected filmography
 The Captain Hates the Sea (1934)
 Shanghai (1935)
 I Live My Life (1935)
 To Beat the Band (1935)
 The Nitwits (1935)
 The Casino Murder Case (1935)
 The Devil on Horseback (1936)
 When's Your Birthday? (1937)
 Melody for Two (1937)
 Prison Train (1938)
 Eternally Yours (1939)
 Society Smugglers (1939)
 Tin Pan Alley (1940)

Notes

References

Bibliography

 Curry, Paul. (1965). Magician's Magic. Dover Publications.
 Pitts, Michael R. (2015). RKO Radio Pictures Horror, Science Fiction and Fantasy Films, 1929-1956. McFarland.
 Price, David. (1985). Magic: A Pictorial History of Conjurers in the Theater. Cornwall Books. 
 Slide, Anthony. (1981). The Vaudevillians: A Dictionary of Vaudeville Performers.  Arlington House.

External links
 
 
 
What Magicians Do When Magical Tricks Go Wrong (May, 1932)

1901 births
1961 deaths
American magicians
American male film actors
Age controversies
20th-century American male actors